Jatto Ceesay (born 16 November 1974) is a Gambian former professional footballer who played as a forward.

Career
Born in Banjul, Ceesay started to play football as a small boy with the Gambian team Wallidan Sens. As a young boy he left to go to the Netherlands. At 20-years of age Ceesay made his debut for Willem II. After eight seasons in which he was a regular first-team player, he left in the summer of 2003, joining Al-Hilal in Saudi Arabia.

This adventure provided no sporting success and he returned in the winter of 2004 to Willem II. He continued to play competitive games for the Tilburgers in the 2003–04 season, though mainly as a back-up. Partly due to the presence of Kevin Bobson, Martijn Reuser and Anouar Hadouir he made only 14 appearances, in which he scored four times. Ceesay also struggled to feature in the 2005–06 season. Eventually he left in the winter to join AEK Larnaca, where he was with Raymond Victoria and Donny de Groot, two former Willem players. In the summer of 2007 these two players left Cyprus. Ceesay followed and returned to the Netherlands, where he joined FC Omniworld.

He stopped playing professionally in 2012.

References

External links
 

1974 births
Living people
Sportspeople from Banjul
Gambian footballers
Association football midfielders
Wallidan FC players
Willem II (football club) players
Al Hilal SFC players
AEK Larnaca FC players
AEP Paphos FC players
Digenis Akritas Morphou FC players
Ayia Napa FC players
Ormideia F.C. players
Almere City FC players
Eredivisie players
Cypriot First Division players
Cypriot Second Division players
The Gambia international footballers
Gambian expatriate footballers
Gambian expatriate sportspeople in the Netherlands
Expatriate footballers in the Netherlands
Gambian expatriate sportspeople in Cyprus
Expatriate footballers in Cyprus
Gambian expatriate sportspeople in Saudi Arabia
Expatriate footballers in Saudi Arabia